The 2000 Kilkenny Intermediate Hurling Championship was the 36th staging of the Kilkenny Intermediate Hurling Championship since its establishment by the Kilkenny County Board in 1929.

On 22 October 2000, Dunnamaggin won the championship after a 5–09 to 1–06 victory over St. Martin's in the final at Nowlan Park. It was their second championship title overall and the first title since 1995.

Results

Semi-finals

Final

References

Kilkenny Intermediate Hurling Championship
Kilkenny Intermediate Hurling Championship